The Heart of Europe Bio-Crystallography Meeting (short HEC-Meeting) is an annual academic conference on structural biology, in particular protein crystallography. Researchers from universities, other research institutions and industry from Austria, Czech Republic, Germany and Poland meet to present and discuss current topics of their research. The talks are predominantly given by PhD students (doctoral students). An exception is the invited HEC lecture, which is held by a renowned scientist of the research field. The format of the HEC meeting has been adopted from the eleven years older Rhine-Knee Regional Meeting on Structural Biology.

History of the HEC-Meeting 
The HEC-Meeting dates back to an initiative in the year 1998 of Manfred Weiss and Rolf Hilgenfeld, who were researchers at the Institute for Molecular Biotechnology (IMB) in Jena and intended to establish a meeting format similar to the Rhine-Knee Regional Meeting on Structural Biology in the New Länder. Both conferences are regional meetings of German scientists together with scientific research groups of the neighbouring countries. Nine groups from Germany (the new states and West-Berlin), Poland and Czech Republic participated in the first HEC-Meeting from 8 to 10 October 1998. Later also groups from Austria and the Old Federal States participated. Due to the Covid-19 pandemic, no meeting was organized in 2020 and HEC-23 took place as an online meeting. 

Former HEC-Meetings:

References

External links 
 Website of HEC-16 at the Attersee, Austria
 Website of HEC-17 in Berlin-Schmöckwitz, Germany
 Website of HEC-18 in Kutná Hora, Czech Republic

Academic conferences
Structural biology